John Alexander Shepherd Buchan (born 17 June 1961) is a former New Zealand rugby union player. A hooker, Buchan represented Canterbury at a provincial level, and was a member of the New Zealand national side, the All Blacks, in 1987. He played two matches for the All Blacks on their tour of Japan that year but did not play in any tests.

References

1961 births
Living people
Rugby union players from Auckland
People educated at Auckland Grammar School
New Zealand rugby union players
New Zealand international rugby union players
Canterbury rugby union players
Rugby union hookers